The Helan Mountains, frequently called Alashan Mountains in older sources, are an isolated desert mountain range forming the border of Inner Mongolia's Alxa League and Ningxia. They run north-south parallel to the north-flowing Yellow River in the Ordos Loop section. The river is mostly east of the mountains, but in the north it crosses without making a significant gorge and flows on the west side. To the west lies the extremely arid Tengger Desert, while to the east is an irrigated area beside the Yellow River, in which lie the cities of Yinchuan and Shizuishan - a little further east of which lies the Mu Us portion of the Ordos Desert. To the north lies the Inner Mongolian city of Wuhai.

They are about 200 km from north to south, from 15 to 50 km wide and average about 2000 meters in altitude (the Yellow River here is about 1,100 meters above sea level).

Emerging wine industry
With the increasing popularity of Ningxia wines, the Chinese authorities have given approval to the development of the eastern base of the Helan Mountains as an area suitable for wine production. Several large Chinese wine companies including Changyu and Dynasty Wine have begun development in the western region of the province. Together they now own 20,000 acres of land for wine plantations and Dynasty has ploughed 100 million yuan into Ningxia. In addition, the major oil company China Petroleum and Chemical Corporation has founded a grape plantation near the Helan Mountains. The household appliance company Midea has also begun participating in Ningxia's wine industry.

Gallery

References

 

Mountain ranges of Inner Mongolia
Landforms of Ningxia
Highest points of Chinese provinces